Oru Veedu Oru Ulagam is a 1978 Indian Tamil-language drama film directed and written by Durai from a story by G. Lalitha. The film stars Srikanth and Shoba, with Major Sundarrajan, Delhi Ganesh, Suruli Rajan, Pandari Bai, Suruli Rajan and Vijay Babu in supporting roles. It was released on 1 December 1978, and Durai won the Tamil Nadu State Film Award for Best Director.

Plot 

Gowri is the daughter of a piously Brahmin household. She has to overcome considerable parental resistance to be allowed access to higher education. Her respect for her divorced professor is misunderstood by some, resulting in her father wanting to discontinue her studies. But she is rescued by marrying Murali, who happens to be her father's friend ARK's son. ARK and Murali are forward in their outlook and Gowri has a wonderful marriage. But when her husband is accidentally drowned, her parents insist on her leading the austere and repressed life of a widow. However, ARK intervenes and manages to get his daughter-in-law remarried.

Cast 
 Srikanth as Amalraj
 Shoba as Gowri
 Major Sundarrajan as ARK
 Delhi Ganesh as the Gurukkal
 Pandari Bai
 Suruli Rajan
 Vijay Babu as Murali

Production 
Oru Veedu Oru Ulagam was directed by Durai and produced by Dass and Raghunath under the banner Movie International. The screenplay was written by Durai and the dialogues by Vietnam Veedu Sundaram from a story by G. Lalitha.

Soundtrack 
The soundtrack of the film was composed by M. S. Viswanathan, while the lyrics were written by Vaali, Alangudi Somu and Pulamaipithan.

References

Bibliography

External links 
 

1970s Tamil-language films
1978 drama films
Films directed by Durai
Films scored by M. S. Viswanathan
Indian drama films